Jacopo di Michele, also called Jacopo Gera, Iacopo di Michele, or Gera da Pisa is a 14th-century painter, active mainly in Pisa and elsewhere in Tuscany, in a Gothic style. His activity is documented from 1361 to 1395. He is the brother of Getto di Jacopo

A list of attributed works includes:
 Flagellation of Christ, with Saints and Donors, private owner Rome
 Madonna and Child, Sanctuary of Montenero, Livorno.   
 St Agatha, Galleria Regionale della Sicilia Palazzo Abatellis, Palermo.   
 Enthroned Madonna and Child with St Francis and Anthony Abbot, Museo Nazionale di San Matteo, Pisa   
 Enthroned Madonna and Child, Pieve dei SS. Giovanni ed Ermolao, Calci. 
 Triptych: St Anne, Madonna and Jesus Child ; St John the Evangelist, and San Giacomo Maggiore; Museo Diocesano, Palermo  
 Flagellation of Christ with Saints, Church of Santa Maria Novella in Montopoli in Val d'Arno.   
 Crucifixion, Church of Santa Maria Novella in Montopoli in Val d'Arno.   
 Mystical Marriage of St Catherine of Alexandria with St Lucy, Pinacoteca and Museo Civico, Volterra.

References

Year of birth unknown
Year of death unknown
14th-century Italian painters
Italian male painters
Painters from Tuscany
Gothic painters